Telmatobius simonsi is a species of frog in the family Telmatobiidae.
It is endemic to Bolivia.
Its natural habitats are subtropical or tropical moist montane forest, subtropical or tropical high-altitude shrubland, subtropical or tropical high-altitude grassland, rivers, freshwater marshes, arable land, pastureland, rural gardens, heavily degraded former forest, ponds, and canals and ditches.
It is threatened by habitat loss. It was named for American scientific collector Perry O. Simons.

References

simonsi
Amphibians of the Andes
Amphibians of Bolivia
Endemic fauna of Bolivia
Taxonomy articles created by Polbot
Amphibians described in 1940